Corey Hall (born January 17, 1979) is a former American football safety who played one season for the Atlanta Falcons. He played in 3 games. He was drafted in the 7th round with the 215th overall pick in the 2001 NFL Draft.

References

External links
Mel Kiper - Sleeper of the Week: Corey Hall - ESPN.com

Living people
1979 births
American football safeties
Atlanta Falcons players
Appalachian State Mountaineers football players
Players of American football from Georgia (U.S. state)
Sportspeople from Athens, Georgia